Tony Ashworth (1954−2019) was a former professional rugby league footballer who played during the 1970s.

References

1954 births
2019 deaths
Australian rugby league players
Manly Warringah Sea Eagles players
North Sydney Bears players
Rugby league wingers